Collina is a suburb  of the  Australian city of Griffith in the Riverina region of New South Wales. The suburb is in the City of Griffith local government area.

The suburb is named for the Italian word for "hill".

Griffith, New South Wales